Friedrich Ettel (8 June 1890 – 12 March 1941) was a Swiss film actor.

Ettel was born in Zurich and died at the age of 50 in Berlin, Germany.

Selected filmography
 Ludwig II, King of Bavaria (1929)
 Two People (1930)
 Louise, Queen of Prussia (1931)
 The Other Side (1931)
 Panik in Chicago (1931)
 Queen of the Night (1931)
 Wibbel the Tailor (1931)
 The Trunks of Mr. O.F. (1931)
 Trenck (1932)
 Eight Girls in a Boat (1932)
 Haunted People (1932)
 Tannenberg (1932)
 A Tremendously Rich Man (1932)
 Impossible Love (1932)
 Typhoon (1933)
 The Merry Heirs (1933)
 Tugboat M 17 (1933)
 There Is Only One Love (1933)
 Two Good Comrades (1933)
 Laughing Heirs (1933)
 Dream of the Rhine (1933)
 Wilhelm Tell (1934)
 The Four Musketeers (1934)
 Heinz in the Moon (1934)
 The Champion of Pontresina (1934)
 Black Fighter Johanna (1934)
 Bashful Felix (1934)
 The Valley of Love (1935)
 Hermine and the Seven Upright Men (1935)
 One Too Many on Board (1935)
 Schloß Vogelöd (1936)
 The Call of the Jungle (1936)
 Nights in Andalusia (1938)
 The Marriage Swindler (1938)
 Marionette (1939)
 Enemies (1940)
 The Three Codonas (1940)

Bibliography
 Jung, Uli & Schatzberg, Walter. Beyond Caligari: The Films of Robert Wiene. Berghahn Books, 1999.

External links

1890 births
1941 deaths
Swiss male film actors
Male actors from Zürich